Muhammad Ashar Al Aafiz bin Abdullah (born 28 March 1995) is a Malaysian professional association footballer who plays as a centre-back for Sri Pahang.

Career statistics

Club

References

External links

Malaysian footballers
Sri Pahang FC players
Association football central defenders
Living people
1995 births